The Cyprus national futsal team is controlled by the Cyprus Football Association, the governing body for futsal in Cyprus and represents the country in international futsal competitions, such as the World Cup and the European Championships.

Competition history

FIFA Futsal World Cup

 1989 - did not compete
 1992 - did not compete
 1996 - did not compete
 2000 - did not compete
 2004 - did not qualify
 2008 - did not qualify
 2012 - did not qualify
 2016 - did not qualify
 2020 - did not qualify

UEFA Futsal Championship

 1996 - did not compete
 1999 - did not qualify
 2001 - did not compete
 2003 - did not qualify
 2005 - did not qualify
 2007 - did not qualify
 2010 - did not qualify
 2012 - did not qualify
 2014 - did not qualify
 2016 - did not qualify
 2018 - did not qualify
 2022 – did not qualify

References

Cyprus
Futsal
Futsal in Cyprus